Chevington may refer to:

Chevington, Suffolk, a village in England
Chevington cheese, a cow's milk cheese
East Chevington, a parish in Northumberland, England
West Chevington, a location in Northumberland, England
Chevington railway station, a former station serving West Chevington

See also 
 Shevington, a village and civil parish within the Metropolitan Borough of Wigan, England